Vitreous china is an enamel coating that is applied to ceramics, particularly porcelain, after they've been fired, though the name can also refer to the finished piece as a whole. The coating makes the porcelain tougher, denser, and shinier, and it is a common choice for things like toilets and sink basins.

History 
Vitreous china’s development tracks closely with other vitreous materials like glass, owing to the similar production process in terms of the materials needed, and preparing and firing such. Because an enamel is essentially glass applied to a substrate or surface to cover it, its production differs from that of glass by only a few steps.

The earliest known objects to be covered with a glaze are glazed stones made for jewellery, having been manufactured in Egypt as early as 4000 BC, in Mesopotamia from 5500-4000 BC, in Europe from 1400 BC and in the Indus Valley from 4500-3500 BC. The first instance of applying an enamel to a substrate was in 3500 BP in Mycenae and Cyprus. The champlevé technique, which involves first placing a glass enamel powder on a substrate and then firing it, was the predecessor technique for applying vitreous china and was used by the Celts from the 1st century BC.

Uses 
Vitreous china is used in a variety of household and sanitaryware items such as basins, toilets, bidets, urinals and bathtubs. Items that use vitreous china are usually ones that are best when kept clean and sanitary, with which a coating of vitreous china enamel helps. Those same vitreous china items also benefit from having stains and spots removed easily due to the nature of their use.

Vitreous china can be occasionally found applied to kitchen countertops and related fixtures. The low occurrence is due to vitreous china’s fragility when exposed to blunt force from crockery and other kitchen items. Instead, plastic and steel are examples of more common kitchen fixture materials.

Vitreous china can also be used for more aesthetic purposes. Items applied with a vitreous china enamel for this purpose include plates and other chinaware in china painting, and Fabergé eggs.

Structure 
Vitreous china, like other enamels, is a glass-particulate composite, meaning it is glass (50-70 wt%) with non-silicate particles strewn about it that give it different properties. Included in the vitreous enamel mixture is clay, which helps hold it all together and gives the necessary flexibility to form it into shape during firing, quartz which reduces shrinkage, and feldspar which increases the liquidity of the mixture when fired into its vitreous phase; this ensures low porosity in the final product.

After vitrification, vitreous china contains mullite, a crystal which forms as a result of reactions taking place in clay. Not all of the quartz and feldspar liquify during firing, and so some of it remains as “relict” (its pre-firing powder form) in the final vitrified product.

Physical properties 
The general purpose of applying vitreous china enamel to a ceramic item like a washbasin is to provide protection for it, and it may be used secondarily for aesthetic purposes. In covering their porcelain substrate, vitreous china gives anti-corrosive properties and helps against weathering and heat. Its non-porosity also prevents bacteria from entering the surface of ceramic material, and so keeps it from building up. Its porosity makes it absorb less than 0.5% of water. The porosity of vitreous china can be reduced by increasing its feldspar content.

Vitreous china is translucent, which, along with its protective nature, has made it preserve artefacts such as jewellery and potentially preserve them in the same state for thousands of years.

Viscosity while vitreous china is in its liquid phase during firing depends on its constitutive ratio of glass to other particles- a higher quantity of particles results in higher viscosity. Vitreous china’s density post vitrification ranges from 1.83 to 2.48 grams per cubic centimetre. Its Poisson ratio is 0.5. Its flexural strength is 400-800 kgf/cm2.

Production 
In most cases, vitreous china consists of a mix of clay, feldspar, flint and quartz sand. This mix is usually fired once at 1200-1300 °C for most applications, and twice fired for use in crockery with a first firing at 900-950 °C and a second firing at 1200-1250 °C. Crockery is fired twice to reduce its porosity. To make the mix more workable, water is usually added. The firing temperature chosen is important, as vitreous and ceramic bodies are less strong and more porous if under or over fired.

Creep is the unwanted distortion a vitreous body undergoes during firing, and is influenced by the substance's rheological properties. Such properties depend on the particles in vitreous china's glass mixture, which can vary in type, size (1-50μm), distribution or shape. The amount of mullite in vitreous china, which is determined by the amount of clay in the starting mixture, is the primary determinant for creep rate during firing.

References

Ceramic materials
Plumbing
Porcelain